TV Guide is an American digital media company

TV Guide may also refer to:

Television 
TV Guide Magazine, an American magazine
TV Guide (Canada), a Canadian magazine
TV Guide (New Zealand), a New Zealand magazine

See also 
Pop (American TV channel), a television channel formerly known as the TV Guide Channel and TV Guide Network
Electronic program guide, a menu containing scheduled television programs and events, also known as TV guides
TV listings, a printed or electronic timetable of television programs also referred to as a TV guide